Ernest Arthur Watts (11 April 1872 – 1956) was an English footballer of the late 19th and early 20th centuries.

Born in Woolhampton in Berkshire, his earliest known club was Reading, before he moved to Notts County, where he made 17 appearances in The Football League. He had a second spell with Reading and also played for West Ham United, where he was captain for the club's final season at the Memorial Grounds, before joining New Brompton in 1904, where he was a regular starter during the 1904–05 season. His later clubs included Grays Athletic and Clapton Orient, as well as two more spells with Reading.

Watts was a soldier and played for the Royal Berkshire Regiment Cricket XI, as well as playing minor counties cricket for Berkshire from 1896–1908, making 85 appearances in the Minor Counties Championship.

References

1872 births
1956 deaths
People from West Berkshire District
English footballers
Gillingham F.C. players
Reading F.C. players
Notts County F.C. players
West Ham United F.C. players
Grays Athletic F.C. players
Leyton Orient F.C. players
Place of death missing
Association football midfielders
Association football goalkeepers
English cricketers
Berkshire cricketers